Love Travels At Illegal Speeds is the sixth solo album by Graham Coxon. It was released 13 March 2006 in the United Kingdom, the day after Coxon's 37th birthday. The album was produced by Stephen Street who also produced Coxon's previous album, Happiness in Magazines.

Reception
At Metacritic, which assigns a normalised rating out of 100 to reviews from mainstream critics, Love Travels at Illegal Speeds has an average score of 81 based on 22 reviews, indicating "universal acclaim".

Track listing
All words and music by Graham Coxon.
 "Standing on My Own Again" – 4:29
 "I Can't Look at Your Skin" – 3:35
 "Don't Let Your Man Know" – 2:54
 "Just a State of Mind" – 4:36
 "You & I" – 3:43
 "Gimme Some Love" – 2:32
 "I Don't Wanna Go Out" – 4:17
 "Don't Believe Anything I Say"  – 5:26
 "Tell It Like It Is" – 4:02
 "Flights to the Sea (Lovely Rain)" – 3:25
 "What's He Got?" – 3:42
 "You Always Let Me Down" – 2:49
 "See a Better Day" – 5:10

Bonus tracks (Japan)
"Click Click Click" (b-side on the "You & I" UK CD single)
"Livin'" (b-side on the "Standing on My Own Again" UK CD single)

Bonus DVD (UK)
Live at Goldsmith's College 22 June 2005
"You Always Let Me Down"
"Spectacular"
"Girl Done Gone"
"Don't Let Your Man Know"
Live at Koko 16 July 2005
"Standing on My Own Again"
"I Can't Look at Your Skin"
"Freakin' Out"
Hidden track
Filmed and edited by Katie and Richard Harris
Track by Track Interview
Interview by Tony Hale
Filmed and edited by Jai Stokes

Release details

References

2006 albums
Graham Coxon albums
Parlophone albums
Albums produced by Stephen Street